Besmilr Brigham (born Bess Miller Moore; September 28, 1913 – September 30, 2000) was an American poet and writer of  short stories.

Brigham was born in Pace, Mississippi. She graduated from Mary Hardin-Baylor College (now University of Mary Hardin–Baylor) in Belton, Texas. After that, she studied at the New School for Social Research in New York. 
In New York she met and married Roy Brigham.

According to the Encyclopedia of Arkansas History & Culture, "She came to prominence during the women’s movement of the 1960s, and her work is noted for its innovative structure, sound, and rhythm."

Brigham is also known as Besmilr Moore Brigham. The Besmilr Women Writers Award is named after her.

Brigham died of complications from Alzheimer's disease in Las Cruces, New Mexico in 2000.

Works
 1969. Agony dance: death of the dancing dolls (poetry)
 2000. Run through rock: selected short poems of Besmilr Brigham (C. D. Wright, ed.)
 1971. Heaved from the earth. (poetry)

For further reading
 G.C. Waldrep, "Why We Chose It: Two poems by besmilr brigham", kenyonreview.org, October 6, 2014
 Martin, Meredith. “An Interview with Heloise Wilson”, The Aux-Arc Review 1 (Fall 2002): 29–40 
 "Robert Yerachmiel Snyderman Looks at Besmilr Brigham's Fermenting Lyric, poetryfoundation.org; accessed November 2, 2017.

External links

 Besmilr Brigham filmed by Forrest Gander

References

1913 births
2000 deaths
Deaths from Alzheimer's disease
Deaths from dementia in New Mexico
People from Bolivar County, Mississippi
American women poets
Writers from Mississippi
20th-century American poets
University of Mary Hardin–Baylor alumni
The New School alumni
20th-century American women writers